Diogo Dias Ressurreição (born 15 August 2000) is a Portuguese professional footballer who plays as a midfielder for Vitória de Guimarães B.

Club career
On 2 July 2022, Ressurreição signed a three-year contract with Vitória de Guimarães. He was assigned to the B squad playing in the Liga 3.

Career statistics

Club

References

2000 births
Sportspeople from Cascais
Living people
Portuguese footballers
Association football midfielders
G.D. Estoril Praia players
S.U. 1º Dezembro players
FC Porto B players
Vitória S.C. B players
Campeonato de Portugal (league) players
Liga Portugal 2 players